The Nicholas Building is a  tall high-rise building located at 608 Madison Avenue in Downtown Toledo. It stood as Toledo's tallest building for 7 years, from its completion in 1906 until the completion of the Riverfront Apartments building in 1913. The Nicholas Building  is currently the seventh-tallest building in Toledo.

History
The seventeen story structure was constructed in 1906 by Toledo business partners A.L. Spitzer and C.M. Spitzer. The Spitzer cousins named the building after their grandfather, Nicholas Spitzer. The building was designed by Norval Bacon and Thomas Huber, partners of the Toledo architectural firm of Bacon & Huber. The Nicholas Building was described in 1910 as one of the "largest and most modern office buildings in the Northwest”, the area known today as the East North Central States.

See also
List of tallest buildings in Toledo, Ohio

References 

Buildings and structures in Toledo, Ohio
Office buildings completed in 1906
Skyscrapers in Ohio
1906 establishments in Ohio